The Cities Police was a Greek police force extant from 1921 to 1984, responsible for policing urban areas. It complemented the Hellenic Gendarmerie, which was responsible for rural and suburban areas.

History 

Its creation was decreed in 1918 (Law 1370/1918) and confirmed in 1920 (Law 2461/1920). The force became operational in the city of Corfu in 1920, followed by Patras (1921), Piraeus (1923) and Athens (1929). Remarkably, in Thessaloniki, Greece's second largest city, the force was not established due to the Gendarmerie's opposition, despite the law's provisions.

Unlike the paramilitary Gendarmerie, which had close ties to the Hellenic Army and was commanded by Army generals, the Cities Police was a purely civilian force, modeled after the Metropolitan Police of London, and with training provided by a British mission under Sir Frederick Loch Halliday.

From the late 1920s, the Cities Police, and especially its feared General Security Directorate, initiated the state persecution of the nascent Communist Party of Greece (KKE), whose popularity was growing among the urban poor, the working classes and the destitute refugees from Asia Minor. In the aftermath of the Greek Civil War, the Gendarmerie and the Cities Police became bastions of the conservative and vehemently anti-Communist establishment, a role they would retain throughout the Greek junta of 1967–74. After the fall of the junta, emphasis was placed on civilian policing. Despite strong opposition from the Gendarmerie, the Cities Police and the Gendarmerie were amalgamated on 1 November 1984 (Law 1481/1-10-1984) into the unified Hellenic Police.

Ranks

References

1921 establishments in Greece
Defunct law enforcement agencies of Greece
1984 disestablishments in Greece